is a Japanese sailor. He belongs to Toyota Motor East Japan.

Life and career 
Makino was born in Kumamoto Prefecture, Japan, on May 6, 1980. He graduated from Ritsumeikan University in Kyoto.

In 2008, he participated at the 2008 Summer Olympics, and placed 12th in 49er class.

In the men's 49er class at the 2012 Summer Olympics, he placed 18th.

At the 2016 Rio Olympics, he paired up with Kenji Takahashi in men's 49er class, and placed 18th.

References

1980 births
Living people
Japanese male sailors (sport)
Olympic sailors of Japan
Sailors at the 2008 Summer Olympics – 49er
Sailors at the 2012 Summer Olympics – 49er
Sailors at the 2016 Summer Olympics – 49er
Sportspeople from Kumamoto Prefecture